The Rio Cubal is a river south of Sumbe, Angola and just north of Kikombo in Cuanza Sul Province, Angola.

Cubal